The Clariosophic Society, also known as ΜΣΦ (Mu Sigma Phi),  is a literary society founded in 1806 at the University of South Carolina, then known as South Carolina College, as a result of the splitting in two of the Philomathic Society, which had been formed within weeks of the opening of the college in 1805 and included virtually all students. At what was called the Synapian Convention held in February, 1806, the members of Philomathic voted to split into two separate societies, one of which became known as Clariosophic, while the other society became known as Euphradian. Two blood brothers picked the members for the new groups in a manner similar to choosing up sides for an impromptu baseball game. John Goodwin became the first president of Clariosophic. Other early presidents include Stephen Elliott, Hugh S. Legaré. George McDuffie and Richard I. Manning. The Society was reactivated in 2013.

Latin Diploma and key
Applicants who had fulfilled all the requirements for membership were given the society's Latin Diploma along with its key to signify their membership. Somewhere along the way, the giving of keys ceased but the key still appeared on the diplomas. The key was shaped like a rhombus or lozenge except that the sides did not meet at the top and bottom, but were blunted off. The front had two overlapping hearts at the top with the Greek letters, Mu Sigma Phi (ΜΣΦ) in the center and the initials  C.S., for Clariosophic Society, at the bottom. The reverse side had the two hearts at the top and two Greek words beginning with the letters, Delta and Phi (ΔΦ) in the center and the initials S.C.C, for South Carolina College, at the bottom.

Notable Members 19th Century
Notable members of the 19th Century include:
 Preston Brooks, later U.S. Representative from South Carolina
 Andrew Pickens Butler, later U.S. senator from SC
 William Butler, later physician and U.S. Representative from South Carolina
 Patrick C. Caldwell, later U.S. Representative from South Carolina
 James Calhoun, later president of the Georgia Senate and mayor of Atlanta, Georgia
John C. Calhoun US Vice President (Honorary member)
 William Capers, later pastor of Columbia's Washington Street Church and a bishop of the Methodist Episcopal Church, South
 William K. Clowney, later U.S. Representative from South Carolina
 Mark Anthony Cooper, later U.S. Representative from Georgia
 Anderson Crenshaw, the first graduate of the South Carolina College, now the University of South Carolina, and later Alabama supreme court justice.
 James Dellet, later  U.S. Representative from Alabama
Stephen Elliott, later First Episcopal Bishop of Georgia & Presiding Bishop of the Episcopal Church in the CSA
 John Gayle, Clariosophic president, later governor of Alabama
 Robert Budd Gilchrist, U.S. federal judge in SC
 William Henry Gist, later governor of SC 
 Wade Hampton III, later governor of SC and U.S. senator from SC
 Hopkins Holsey, later U.S. Representative from Georgia
Hugh S. Legaré, later US Attorney General
 Dixon Hall Lewis, later U.S. Senator from Alabama
 Charles James McDonald, later governor of Georgia and Georgia supreme court justice
George McDuffie, later SC Governor and U.S. Senator from SC
 Basil Manly, later Baptist minister and president of the University of Alabama
Richard I. Manning, later SC Governor and  U.S. Representative from South Carolina
 John Murphy, later governor of Alabama
 John Belton O'Neall (1793-1863), South Carolina State Representative 1816-1828, Judge of the South Carolina Court of Appeals 1830, and member of the U.S. O'Neall political family
 Eugenius Aristides Nisbet, later U.S. Representative from Georgia and Georgia supreme court justice
 William T. Nuckolls, later U.S. Representative from South Carolina
 Francis Wilkinson Pickens, later U.S. Representative from South Carolina, U.S. ambassador to Russia and Governor of South Carolina
 Henry L. Pinckney, later  U.S. Representative from South Carolina
Henry William Ravenel, Botanist
 James Rogers, later U.S. Representative from South Carolina
 Benjamin Glover Shields, later U.S. Representative from Alabama and United States Chargé d'Affaires in Venezuela
 Edwin G. Seibels, while a student served in the SC House;  later became an insurance executive and invented the vertical filing cabinet.
 Waddy Thompson, Jr., later U.S. Representative from South Carolina
 Louis T. Wigfall, US Senator from Texas and Confederate Senator from Texas

Notable Members 20th Century
William Jennings Bryan Dorn, U.S. Representative from South Carolina 
Walton James McLeod, III, Member of SC Legislature

External links
Clariosophic.org Official Website
Walton J. McLeod, Member of SC Legislature
Eugene Platt, Poet, and 2010 SC State House Candidate

Resources
Haygood, Tamara Miner (2006). Henry William Ravenel, 1814-1887 South Carolina scientist in the Civil War Era, Tuscaloosa: University of Alabama Press.
Hollis, Daniel Walker (1951). University of South Carolina, volume I: South Carolina College, Columbia: University of South Carolina Press.

References

College literary societies in the United States
History of South Carolina
University of South Carolina